Rubber Research Institute Ground is a cricket ground in located at the Rubber Research Institute of Malaysia Research Station at Jalan Sungai Buloh near Kota Damansara, Selangor, Malaysia.  The first recorded match held on the ground came in 1993 when Malaysia played Singapore in the Saudara Cup. 

In 1997, the ground held ten matches in the ICC Trophy.  The following year it held three List A matches as part of the cricket competition at the 1998 Commonwealth Games.  These matches saw Kenya play Pakistan, Barbados play Northern Ireland, and Kenya play Scotland.

References

External links
Rubber Research Institute Ground, Kuala Lumpur at CricketArchive

Cricket grounds in Malaysia
Sports venues in Selangor